Top Chef Brasil is a Brazilian cooking competition television series based on the American television series Top Chef. The series premiered on Wednesday, April 3, 2019 at 10:30 p.m. (BRT / AMT) on RecordTV.

The winner is awarded a R$300.000 cash prize and the title of Top Chef.

Series overview

Ratings and reception

Brazilian ratings
All numbers are in points and provided by Kantar Ibope Media.

References

External links
 Tof Chef Brasil on R7.com

2019 Brazilian television series debuts
Brazilian reality television series
Portuguese-language television shows
RecordTV original programming
 
Brazilian television series based on American television series